Samre, is a nearly extinct Pearic language of Thailand and, formerly, Cambodia. The language is evidently extinct in Cambodia, but a 1998 survey found 20–30 speakers in Nonsi Subdistrict, Bo Rai District, Trat Province, Thailand and estimated the total number of people able to speak the language to be 200.

Phonology
The phonemic inventory is typical of modern Mon-Khmer languages and, along with the other Pearic languages, shows some phonological influences from the late Middle Khmer of the 17th century. Samre also shows influence from Thai in that it has a developing tonal system. Like many other Austroasiatic languages in general, and the Pearic languages in particular, Samre vowels may differ in voice quality, a system known as "register", or "phonation". However, the breathy voice versus clear voice distinction is no longer contrastive and is secondary to a word's tone.

Consonants
They are listed in table form below.

The Samre recognize  as a sound unique to their language in comparison to Thai and other surrounding indigenous languages. The pronunciation  is mostly heard among the older generation who consider it to be the "correct" pronunciation. The  sound is not often heard among younger or less fluent speakers who use  or replace the sound with a tapped or trilled  due to influence from Thai.

Vowels
Samre contrasts nine vowel qualities which can be either short or long, yielding a total of 18 vowel phonemes. The vowels of Samre are:

References

Pearic languages
Endangered Austroasiatic languages
Languages of Thailand